The 5th Australian Academy of Cinema and Television Arts International Awards (commonly known as the AACTA International Awards), presented by the Australian Academy of Cinema and Television Arts (AACTA), a non-profit organisation whose aim is to identify, award, promote and celebrate Australia's greatest achievements in film and television. Awards were handed out for the best films of 2015 regardless of the country of origin, and are the international counterpart to the awards for Australian films.

The nominations were announced on 6 January 2016 with Carol (2015) leading the nominees with five. The award winners were announced on 29 January 2016 and broadcast in Australia on 31 January 2016 on Foxtel Arts and Arena.

Winners and nominees

See also
 5th AACTA Awards
 21st Critics’ Choice Awards
 22nd Screen Actors Guild Awards
 69th British Academy Film Awards
 73rd Golden Globe Awards
 88th Academy Awards

References

External links
 The Official Australian Academy of Cinema and Television Arts website
 Official Website of the AACTA International Awards broadcast

AACTA International Awards
AACTA International Awards
AACTA Awards ceremonies
AACTA International
2016 in American cinema